Alessandro Cavallaro (born 22 February 1980, in Paternò) is an Italian sprinter who specialized in the 200 metres.

Biography
He finished seventh in 4 x 100 metres relay at the 2000 Olympic Games, together with teammates Francesco Scuderi, Maurizio Checcucci and Andrea Colombo. He also won the gold medal at the 1999 European Junior Championships, and competed at the 2002 European Championships, the 2003 World Championships and the 2006 European Championships without reaching the final.

His personal best times were 10.35 seconds in the 100 metres, achieved in May 2003 in Catania; 20.42 seconds in the 200 metres, achieved at the 2003 World Championships and 46.33 seconds in the 400 metres, achieved in May 2001 in Catania.

Olympic results

See also
 Italian all-time lists - 200 metres
 Italy national relay team

References

External links
 

1980 births
Living people
People from Paternò
Italian male sprinters
Athletes (track and field) at the 2000 Summer Olympics
Olympic athletes of Italy
Athletics competitors of Fiamme Gialle
World Athletics Championships athletes for Italy
Italian Athletics Championships winners
Sportspeople from the Province of Catania